Postalveolar affricates are a type of consonant sound. The most common postalveolar affricates are:
Voiced postalveolar affricate
Voiceless postalveolar affricate

Affricates
Postalveolar consonants
Pulmonic consonants
Central consonants